The 1889 Home Nations Championship was the seventh series of the rugby union Home Nations Championship. Three matches were played between 2 February and 2 March. It was contested by Ireland, Scotland and Wales. England were excluded from the Championship due to their refusal to join the International Rugby Board.

Scotland won the championship outright for the second time.

Table

Results

Scoring system
The matches for this season were decided on goals scored. A goal was awarded for a successful conversion after a try, for a dropped goal or for a goal from mark. If a game was drawn, any unconverted tries were tallied to give a winner. If there was still no clear winner, the match was declared a draw.

The matches

Scotland vs. Wales

Scotland: HFT Chambers (Edinburgh U.), WF Holms (Edinburgh Wanderers), HJ Stevenson (Edinburgh Acads), James Holt Marsh (Edinburgh Inst FP), CE Orr (West of Scotland), CFP Fraser (Glasgow University), W Auld (West of Scotland), JD Boswell (West of Scotland), A Duke (Royal HSFP), HT Ker (Glasgow Acads), MC McEwan (Edinburgh Acads), WA McDonald (Glasgow University), A Methuen (Cambridge U.), DS Morton (West of Scotland) capt., TB White (Edinburgh Acads)

Wales: Hugh Hughes (Cardiff), Dickie Garrett (Penarth), James Webb (Newport), Edward Bishop (Swansea), Martyn Jordan (London Welsh), Charlie Thomas (Newport), Rosser Evans (Cardiff), Sydney Nicholls (Cardiff), Frank Hill (Cardiff) capt., William Williams (Cardiff), David William Evans (Cardiff), Theo Harding (Newport), Jim Hannan (Newport), Rowley Thomas (London Welsh), William Bowen (Swansea)

Ireland vs. Scotland

Ireland: LJ Holmes (Lisburn), RA Yates (Dublin University), TB Pedlow (Queen's College, Belfast), DC Woods (Bessbrook), J Stevenson (Lisburn), RG Warren (Lansdowne) capt., HW Andrews (NIFC), TM Donovan (Queen's College, Cork), EG Forrest (Wanderers), JS Jameson (Lansdowne), J Moffatt (Belfast Albion), LC Nash (Queen's College, Cork), CRR Stack (Dublin University), R Stevenson (Lisburn), FO Stoker (Wanderers)

Scotland: HFT Chambers (Edinburgh U.), WF Holms (London Scottish), HJ Stevenson (Edinburgh Acads), James Holt Marsh (Edinburgh Inst FP), CE Orr (West of Scotland), Darsie Anderson (London Scottish), AI Aitken (Edinburgh Inst FP), JD Boswell (West of Scotland), A Duke (Royal HSFP), TW Irvine (Edinburgh Acads), MC McEwan (Edinburgh Acads), JG McKendrick (West of Scotland), A Methuen (Cambridge U.), DS Morton (West of Scotland) capt., JE Orr (West of Scotland)

Wales vs. Ireland

Wales: Ned Roberts (Llanelli), Abel Davies (London Welsh), Arthur Gould (Newport) capt., Tom Morgan (Llanelli), Norman Biggs (Cardiff), Charlie Thomas (Newport), Giotto Griffiths (Llanelli), William Bowen (Swansea), D Morgan (Swansea), Sydney Nicholls (Cardiff), David William Evans (Cardiff), Theo Harding (Newport), Jim Hannan (Newport), Rowley Thomas (London Welsh), Dan Griffiths (Llanelli)

Ireland: LJ Holmes (Lisburn), RA Yates (Dublin U.), RW Dunlop (Dublin U.), TB Pedlow (Queens College, Belfast), RG Warren (Lansdowne) capt., AC McDonnell (Dublin U.), Victor Le Fanu (Lansdowne), JS Jameson (Lansdowne), EG Forrest (Wanderers), J Cotton (Wanderers), J Waites (Bective Rangers), HW Andrews (NIFC), JN Lytle (NIFC), R Stevenson (Lisburn), HA Richey (Dublin U.)

References

External links

Bibliography
 
 

1888-89
1889 in Irish sport
1888–89 in Welsh rugby union
1888–89 in Scottish rugby union
Home Nations Championship
Home Nations Championship